Leroy Sanchez (born September 1, 1991, in Abetxuko, Spain) is a Spanish singer-songwriter.

Early life 
Leroy Sanchez  was born in Abetxuko, Vitoria, Spain, where he taught himself to play guitar.  At the age of 15, Sanchez uploaded his first cover song on YouTube, and his videos have since received more than 600 million views and he has over 4.35 million subscribers. In 2010, Sanchez met producer Jim Jonsin, who brought him to Miami. Sanchez is currently based in Los Angeles, California.

Career 
Leroy released two singles in 2014, "By My Side" and "Little Dancer".

In 2016, he was nominated for a Premios Juventud Award, and a Teen Choice Award.

Sanchez is an independent artist. He headlined the Man of the Year Tour, his first international run, from January to March 2017 and his Elevated Tour, from September to November 2017. Sanchez released his debut EP, Elevated, on August 4, 2017. He also released the Christmas song "It Ain't Christmas Without You". 

Leroy's most viewed video on his YouTube channel is his cover of Adele's "Hello" with over 54 million views. 

In 2018, he released his a single called "Preacher". Following Preacher in 2020, he released his first Spanish single "Miedo" along with an official acoustic version. On November 11, 2020, he released a Christmas EP called The Greatest Gift.

He composed the song "Voy a quedarme" alongside Blas Cantó, Dangelo and Dan Hammond for the Eurovision Song Contest 2021, which was sung by Blas Cantó representing Spain. Following this, he released an English version of the song called "I'll Stay".

On 24th September 2021, Leroy released a song called "Out My Way" and a few weeks later he released "Proud", one of his most personal songs. On 19th November 2021, Leroy released an EP called Standby with five songs: "Out My Way", "Proud", "River Lie", "Save This Love" and "Stay for A While".

In 2021, Sanchez was one of the songwriters for the song "SloMo", sang by Chanel, which represented Spain for the Eurovision Song Contest 2022.

Discography

EPs 

 2017: Elevated
 2020: The Greatest Gift
 2021: STANDBY 
 2022: STANDBY (Español)

Singles 

 2014: Little Dancer
 2015: By My Side
 2017: Beauty and the Beast (with Lorea Turner)
 2017: Perfect
 2017: Man of the Year
 2017: Love In The Dark
 2018: Preacher
 2019: Until I Reach You
 2019: Bridges
 2020: Miedo
 2021: Afterglow
 2021: I'll Stay
 2021: Voy a quedarme
 2021: Lofis
 2021: Calm
 2021: Out My Way
 2021: Proud
 2022: Til Death Do Us Part
 2022: Unchained Melody
 2022: Bla, Bla, Bla

Songwriting credits

Awards and nominations

Results

Tours

Headlining 

 2017: Man Of The Year Tour
 2017: Elevated Tour
 2022: STANDBY - Live In Concert

Supporting Act 

 2016: Be Somebody World Tour (for Boyce Avenue)

References

1991 births
Living people
Basque musicians
People from Vitoria-Gasteiz
Singers from Los Angeles
21st-century American singers